Human Emergency is the third album from the popular Christian hip hop group the Cross Movement, released on October 31, 2000. It included The Ambassador, EarthQuake, Enock, Phanatik and Tonic.

Music video
A music video was made for the song "Know Me".

Track listing
Intro - Dispatch (We Called You) 
The Light (The Blazin' One) [feat. Da’ T.R.U.T.H.]
Hold it Down
C to the R 
On the Move
Know Me (Huh, What?)
In Route (Interlude) 
What Do You See? 
Love Life
Come in London (Interlude)
Lord? [feat. M.O.D.]
Creature Double Feature
Somebody Help! (Interlude)
On Right Now
All Day
Remember
Live Agua 
To My Peoples
Back Up
Cypha’ 911

External links
 "Know Me" Music Video

2000 albums
The Cross Movement albums
Cross Movement Records albums